The supreme leader of North Korea is the de facto paramount leader of the Workers' Party of Korea, the state and the Korean People's Army. The title has not been written into the national constitution as a separate office, however the president of the State Affairs Commission is, de facto, the supreme leader of North Korea. Likewise, according to the WPK Charter, the general secretary of the WPK is the supreme leader of the Workers' Party. Formerly, under Kim Jong-il, this title was bestowed on the office of Chairman of the National Defence Commission, who was also the WPK general secretary. The first leader of the state prior to the existence of North Korea was Terenty Shtykov who served as the head of the Soviet Civil Administration, the governing authority controlled by the Soviet Union that ruled the northern half of Korea from 1945 to 1948.

The first priority political position of the supreme leader is the leadership of the Workers' Party. That post was titled as Chairman from the founding of the DPRK in 1948 until 1966, General Secretary from 1966 to 2012, First Secretary from 2012 to 2016, Chairman again from 2016 to 2021, and General Secretary again since 2021. Propaganda workers began calling Kim Il-sung supreme leader in the late 1940s and the term has since been used to describe the status of Kim Jong-il and Kim Jong-un. Generally however, Kim Il-sung and Kim Jong-il were both referred to as "Great Leader" and "Dear Leader" respectively during their tenures as leader.

List

Bold offices refer to the highest positions in the Workers' Party of Korea, the unique ruling political party of North Korea.

Timeline

See also

 Eternal leaders of North Korea
 Kim family
 Government of North Korea
 North Korean cult of personality
 Residences of North Korean leaders
 Paramount Leader, the Chinese equivalent

References

External links
 World StatesmenNorth Korea

North Korea, Leaders
Positions of authority
Government of North Korea
Lists of North Korean people
North Korea politics-related lists